Deux frères is the third studio album by French cloud rap duo PNL. It was released on 5 April 2019 through the duo's own QLF Records. The album was preceded by the singles "À l'ammoniaque", "91's", "Au DD", "Deux frères" and "Blanka".

Track listing

Charts

Weekly charts

Year-end charts

Certifications

Awards and nominations

References

External links
 Official website  

2019 albums
PNL (rap duo) albums